Mass production is the production of large amounts of standardized products, including and especially on assembly lines.

Mass Production may also refer to:
 Mass Production (band), an American funk/disco group
 Mass Production (Iggy Pop), a 1977 track from the album The Idiot